The Castle Guide is a supplemental rulebook published in 1990 for the 2nd edition of the Advanced Dungeons & Dragons fantasy role-playing game.

Contents
The Castle Guide is a rules supplement intended for the 2nd edition Dungeon Master's Guide which covers life in feudal lands, and how to build, run, siege, and defend castles. The Castle Guide describes three ordinary types of castles, as well as 12 special castles geared towards specific types of AD&D characters such as thieves, wizards, dwarves, and orcs.

Publication history
DMGR2 The Castle Guide was written by Grant Boucher, Troy Christensen, Arthur Collins, and Nigel Findley, with Timothy B. Brown and William W. Connors, and was published by TSR in 1990 as a 128-page book.

Reception
In the July 1990 edition of Games International (Issue 16), the reviewer was very positive about this product, saying that it provided "a fairly detailed feudal medieval background [...] What a shame that AD&D is so ill-suited to such a game... Still worth getting for the background material."

Other reviews
White Wolf #27 (1991)

References

Dungeons & Dragons sourcebooks
Role-playing game supplements introduced in 1990